John Crowther Hendren (April 25, 1897 – June 3, 1964) was an American football player who played college football for Bucknell University and later professionally in the National Football League.

Early life and career
Hendren attended Northeast High school and later played college football for Bucknell University. He was named captain of the team in 1917 but went on to serve with the Army in France during World War I where he was wounded in action. Following his return in 1919, he was once again elected the captain of the team.

He later played professionally in the National Football League (NFL) with the Canton Bulldogs in 1920 and the Cleveland Indians in 1921. Hendren scored his lone professional touchdown while playing for the latter team, during a 17–0 victory over the New York Brickley Giants.

Later life and death
Hendren later worked as a salesman for the US Rubber Company. He died in 1964 at the Delaware County Memorial Hospital at the age of 67.

References

1897 births
1964 deaths
American football halfbacks
Bucknell Bison football players
Canton Bulldogs players
Cleveland Indians (NFL) players
Players of American football from Philadelphia